The 2012–13 Carolina Hurricanes season was the 41st season for the franchise. Its 34th season in the National Hockey League (NHL) since June 22, 1979, and 15th season since the franchise relocated to North Carolina to start the 1997–98 NHL season. The regular season was reduced from its usual 82 games to 48 due to a lockout.

The Hurricanes did not qualify for the 2013 Stanley Cup playoffs.

Off-season

Regular season

Season standings

Schedule and results

|- bgcolor="#fcf"
| 1 || 19 || Carolina Hurricanes || 1–5 || Florida Panthers || Ward || BB&T Center (19,688) || 0–1–0 || 0 
|- bgcolor="#fcf"
| 2 || 22 || Tampa Bay Lightning || 4–1 || Carolina Hurricanes || Ward || PNC Arena (18,680) || 0–2–0 || 0 
|- bgcolor="#cfc"
| 3 || 24 || Buffalo Sabres || 3–6 || Carolina Hurricanes || Ward || PNC Arena (18,081) || 1–1–0 || 2 
|- bgcolor="#cfc"
| 4 || 25 || Carolina Hurricanes || 3–1 || Buffalo Sabres || Ellis || First Niagara Center (18,824) || 2–2–0 || 4 
|- bgcolor="#fcf"
| 5 || 28 || Boston Bruins || 5–3 || Carolina Hurricanes || Ward || PNC Arena (17,190) || 2–3–0 || 4 
|-

|- bgcolor="#cfc"
| 6 || 1 || Ottawa Senators || 0–1 || Carolina Hurricanes || Ellis || PNC Arena (18,680) || 3–3–0 || 6 
|- bgcolor="#fcf"
| 7 || 2 || Carolina Hurricanes || 3–5 || Philadelphia Flyers || Ellis || Wells Fargo Center (19,691) || 3–4–0 || 6 
|- bgcolor="#cfc"
| 8 || 4 || Carolina Hurricanes || 4–1 || Toronto Maple Leafs || Ward || Air Canada Centre (19,072) || 4–4–0 || 8
|- bgcolor="#cfc"
| 9 || 7 || Carolina Hurricanes || 3–2 SO || Ottawa Senators || Ward || Scotiabank Place (17,337) || 5–4–0 || 10
|- bgcolor="#ffc"
| 10 || 9 || Carolina Hurricanes || 3–4 OT || Philadelphia Flyers || Ward || Wells Fargo Center (19,691) || 5–4–1 || 11
|- bgcolor="#cfc"
| 11 || 11 || Carolina Hurricanes || 6–4 || New York Islanders || Ward || Nassau Coliseum (9,622) || 6–4–1 || 13
|- bgcolor="#cfc"
| 12 || 12 || Carolina Hurricanes || 4–2 || New Jersey Devils || Ward || Prudential Center (17,625) || 7–4–1 || 15
|- bgcolor="#cfc"
| 13 || 14 || Toronto Maple Leafs || 1–3 || Carolina Hurricanes || Ellis || PNC Arena (18,680) || 8–4–1 || 17 
|- bgcolor="#fcf"
| 14 || 18 || Carolina Hurricanes || 0–3 || Montreal Canadiens || Ward || Bell Center (21,273) || 8–5–1 || 17
|- bgcolor="#fcf"
| 15 || 21 || Winnipeg Jets || 4–3 || Carolina Hurricanes || Ward || PNC Arena (18,282) || 8–6–1 || 17
|- bgcolor="#fcf"
| 16 || 23 || Tampa Bay Lightning || 5–2 || Carolina Hurricanes || Ellis || PNC Arena (18,680) || 8–7–1 || 17
|- bgcolor="#cfc"
| 17 || 24 || Carolina Hurricanes || 4–2 || New York Islanders || Ward || Nassau Coliseum (10,048) || 9–7–1 || 19
|- bgcolor="#fcf"
| 18 || 26 || Carolina Hurricanes || 0–3 || Washington Capitals || Ward || Verizon Center (18,506) || 9–8–1 || 19
|- bgcolor="#cfc"
| 19 || 28 || Pittsburgh Penguins || 1–4|| Carolina Hurricanes || Ward || PNC Arena (18,680) || 10–8–1 || 21
|-

|- bgcolor="#cfc"
| 20 || 2 || Florida Panthers || 2–6 || Carolina Hurricanes || Ward || PNC Arena (18,680) || 11–8–1 || 23
|- bgcolor="#cfc"
| 21 || 3 || Carolina Hurricanes || 3–2 || Florida Panthers || Ward || BB&T Center (15,978) || 12–8–1 || 25
|- bgcolor="#cfc"
| 22 || 5 || Buffalo Sabres || 3–4 || Carolina Hurricanes || Peters || PNC Arena (15,277) || 13–8–1 || 27
|- bgcolor="#fcf"
| 23 || 7 || Montreal Canadiens || 4–2 || Carolina Hurricanes || Peters || PNC Arena (16,774) || 13–9–1 || 27
|- bgcolor="#cfc"
| 24 || 9 || New Jersey Devils || 3–6 || Carolina Hurricanes || Ellis || PNC Arena (18,680) || 14–9–1 || 29
|- bgcolor="#cfc"
| 25 || 12 || Carolina Hurricanes || 4–0 || Washington Capitals || Peters || Verizon Center (18,506) || 15–9–1 || 31
|- bgcolor="#fcf"
| 26 || 14 || Washington Capitals || 3–2 || Carolina Hurricanes || Ellis || PNC Arena (16,810) || 15–10–1 || 31
|- bgcolor="#fcf"
| 27 || 16 || Carolina Hurricanes || 1–4 || Tampa Bay Lightning || Peters || Times Forum (19,204) || 15–11–1 || 31
|- bgcolor="#ffc"
| 28 || 18 || Carolina Hurricanes || 1–2 SO || New York Rangers || Ellis || Madison Square Garden (17,200) || 15–11–2 || 32
|- bgcolor="#fcf"
| 29 || 19 || Florida Panthers || 4–1 || Carolina Hurricanes || Ellis || PNC Arena (16,349) || 15–12–2 || 32
|- bgcolor="#fcf"
| 30 || 21 || New Jersey Devils || 4–1 || Carolina Hurricanes || Ellis || PNC Arena (16,941) || 15–13–2 || 32
|- bgcolor="#fcf"
| 31 || 26 || Winnipeg Jets || 4–1 || Carolina Hurricanes || Peters || PNC Arena (16,225) || 15–14–2 || 32
|- bgcolor="#fcf"
| 32 || 28 || Carolina Hurricanes || 3–6 || Toronto Maple Leafs || Peters || Air Canada Centre (19,236) || 15–15–2 || 32
|- bgcolor="#cfc"
| 33 || 30 || Carolina Hurricanes || 3–1 || Winnipeg Jets || Peters || MTS Centre (15,004) || 16–15–2 || 34
|-

|- bgcolor="#fcf"
| 34 || 1 || Carolina Hurricanes || 1–4 || Montreal Canadiens || Peters || Bell Center (21,273) || 16–16–2 || 34
|- bgcolor="#fcf"
| 35 || 2 || Washington Capitals || 5–3 || Carolina Hurricanes || Peters || PNC Arena (16,530) || 16–17–2 || 34
|- bgcolor="#fcf"
| 36 || 4 || Tampa Bay Lightning || 5–0 || Carolina Hurricanes || Ellis || PNC Arena (17,042) || 16–18–2 || 34
|- bgcolor="#fcf"
| 37 || 6 || New York Rangers || 4–1 || Carolina Hurricanes || Ellis || PNC Arena (17,457) || 16–19–2 || 34
|- bgcolor="#fcf"
| 38 || 8 || Carolina Hurricanes || 2–6 || Boston Bruins || Ellis || TD Garden (17,565) || 16–20–2 || 34
|- bgcolor="#fcf"
| 39 || 9 || Pittsburgh Penguins || 5–3 || Carolina Hurricanes || Peters || PNC Arena (17,168) || 16–21–2 || 34
|- bgcolor="#fcf"
| 40 || 11 || Carolina Hurricanes || 1–3 || Washington Capitals || Peters || Verizon Center (18,506) || 16–22–2 || 34
|- bgcolor="#cfc"
| 41 || 13 || Boston Bruins || 2–4 || Carolina Hurricanes || Peters || PNC Arena (18,680) || 17–22–2 || 36
|- bgcolor="#fcf"
| 42 || 16 || Carolina Hurricanes || 2–3 || Ottawa Senators || Peters || Scotiabank Place (19,181) || 17–23–2 || 36
|- bgcolor="#ffc"
| 43 || 18 || Carolina Hurricanes || 3–4 OT || Winnipeg Jets || Peters || MTS Centre (15,004) || 17–23–3 || 37
|- bgcolor="#fcf"
| 44 || 20 || Philadelphia Flyers || 5–3 || Carolina Hurricanes || Peters || PNC Arena (18,112) || 17–24–3 || 37
|- bgcolor="#cfc"
| 45 || 21 || Carolina Hurricanes || 3–2 || Tampa Bay Lightning || Ellis || Times Forum (19,204) || 18–24–3 || 39
|- bgcolor="#cfc"
| 46 || 23 || New York Islanders || 3–4 SO || Carolina Hurricanes || Ellis || PNC Arena (16,601) || 19–24–3 || 41
|- bgcolor="#ffc"
| 47 || 25 || New York Rangers || 4–3 OT || Carolina Hurricanes || Ellis || PNC Arena (17,172) || 19–24–4 || 42
|- bgcolor="#fcf"
| 48 || 27 || Carolina Hurricanes || 3–8 || Pittsburgh Penguins || Peters || Consol Energy Center (18,658)|| 19–25–4 || 42
|-

|- style="text-align:center;"
| Legend:       = Win       = Loss       = OT/SO LossAlternate Jersey

Player statistics
Final stats 

Skaters

Goaltenders

†Denotes player spent time with another team before joining the Hurricanes. Stats reflect time with the Hurricanes only.
‡Traded mid-season
Bold/italics denotes franchise record

Transactions 

The Hurricanes have been involved in the following transactions during the 2012–13 season.

Trades 

|}

Free agents acquired

Free agents lost

Claimed via waivers

Lost via waivers

Lost via retirement

Player signings

Draft picks

Carolina Hurricanes' picks at the 2012 NHL Entry Draft, held in Pittsburgh, Pennsylvania on June 22 & 23, 2012. 

Draft Notes

 The Carolina Hurricanes' first-round pick went to the Pittsburgh Penguins as the result of a June 22, 2012, trade that sent Jordan Staal to the Hurricanes in exchange for Brandon Sutter, Brian Dumoulin and this pick.
 The San Jose Sharks' second-round pick went to the Carolina Hurricanes as a result of a February 18, 2011, trade that sent Ian White to the Sharks in exchange for this pick.
 The Boston Bruins' fourth-round pick went to the Carolina Hurricanes as a result of a July 5, 2011, trade that sent Joe Corvo to the Bruins in exchange for this pick.
 The New Jersey Devils' fourth-round pick went to the Carolina Hurricanes as a result of a January 20, 2012, trade that sent Alexei Ponikarovsky to the Devils in exchange for Joe Sova and this pick.

References

Carolina Hurricanes seasons
Car
Car
Carolina Hurricanes
Carolina Hurricanes